Magic Touch is a live album by Chicago blues guitarist and vocalist Magic Sam, with harmonica player Shakey Jake. The set list only included one Magic Sam original, "All Your Love", his signature tune first recorded for Cobra Records in 1957. Four feature Shakey Jake on vocal and/or harmonica, including his composition "Sawed Off Shotgun".  Several of the songs are contemporary 1965–1966 R&B blues-style songs popularized by Junior Parker, Little Joe Blue, Jimmy Robins, and Jimmy McCracklin performed in Magic Sam's distinctive style. 

The low-fidelity recording was made by George Adins, a Belgian blues and amateur field recording enthusiast. The Dutch Black Magic label released the original album in 1983 and indicated that the performance was recorded in 1968 at Silvio's, a club in Chicago. The 1993 Black Top Records CD reissue notes that it was recorded in December 1966.

Critical reception

In a review for AllMusic, blues historian Bill Dahl commented:

Track listing

Personnel
Magic Sam − guitar, vocals
Shakey Jake – harmonica, vocals on side 1 tracks 1, 5 and side 2 tracks 3, 4, 7
Mack Thompson – bass
Odie Payne – drums

Notes

References

1983 live albums
Magic Sam live albums